Luigi Piccinato (30 October 1899 – 29 July 1983) was an Italian architect and town planner.

Works
 Urbanistica medioevale, Florence, 1943
 Napoli Centrale railway station, Naples, 1954
 Stadio Adriatico, Pescara, 1955
 A-Block Apartment Buildings in the First Section of Ataköy, Istanbul, 1957
 La strada come strumento di progettazione urbanistica, Rome, 1960

Bibliography
 Cesare de Sessa, Luigi Piccinato, architetto, Dedalo libri, Bari 1985
 Federico Malusardi, Luigi Piccinato e l'urbanistica moderna, Officina, Roma 1993
 Elio Franzin, Luigi Piccinato e l'antiurbanistica a Padova 1927-1974 con alcuni scritti padovani di Luigi Piccinato, Ed. Il prato, Saonara (PD), 2005
 Luigi Piccinato: Il "Momento Urbanistico" alla Prima Mostra Nazionale dei Piani Regolatori, con 51 illustrazioni, in "Architettura e Arti Decorative" Anno IX, Fascicolo V e VI gennaio-febbraio 1930 Leggere l'articolo
 Luigi Piccinato (1899-1983) et Nikolaus Pevsner (1902-1983), in "Architettura, cronache e storia" vol. 29, no. 11 (337), 1983 Nov, p. 761

References

 Arch. Piccinato Luigi. Fascismo - Architettura - Arte / Arte fascista web site

1899 births
1983 deaths
People from Legnago
20th-century Italian architects
Italian fascist architecture
Italian urban planners